Thomas Kane may refer to:

Thomas Kane (economist) (born 1961), Harvard professor
Thomas Kane (Medal of Honor) (1841–?), American Civil War sailor
Thomas Kane, member of The Slickee Boys
Thomas Franklin Kane (1863–1953), president of the University of Washington
Thomas L. Kane (1822–1883), Civil War veteran
Thomas R. Kane (1924–2019), Stanford professor of applied mechanics
Tommy Kane (born 1964), American football player
Tom Kane (born 1962), American voice actor
Tom Kane (baseball) (1906–1973), Major League Baseball player
Tom Kane (film producer), American film and television producer
Tommy Kane, character in Alex Cross

See also
Tom Kain (born 1963), director of sports marketing at Nike
Thomas Kean (pronounced like Kane, born 1935), former New Jersey governor and head of the 9/11 Commission